The Ait Ouriaghel (also written as Ayt Waryaɣar or Ayt Uryaɣal in Tarifit) is one of the biggest Riffian tribes of the Rif region of the north-eastern part of Morocco and one of the most populous. Ait Waryagher means "those who do not back off/ those who do not retreat". They inhabit most of the territory around the city of Al Hoceima. The Ayt Waryaghar speak the "Western-Tarifit" dialect of the Riffian language. 

The Ait Waryaɣar were the main group which participated in the Rif wars (see Republic of the Rif) against the Spanish Protectorate in Morocco at the beginning of 20th century. The Spanish authorities considered it the nucleus of insumisión to the colonial authority in the Eastern zone of the protectorate (see Battle of Annual).

During the Rif War of 1921-1926, the leadership of the Ait Waryaghar was concentrated in the Al-Khattabi family and, in particular, in Muhammad bin Abd el-Krim al-Khattabi. Its centre was the small locality of Ajdir in the bay of Al Hoceima. Muhammad bin Abd el-Krim al-Khattabi made an alliance with the tribesmen of the Ait Touzine tribe to stop the Spaniards at the Nekor river in Temsamane.

History
Before modern times, few information was available concerning the tribe. Mr. Abd-el-krim Al Khattabi, leader of the confederation of the united tribes of the rif during the colonisation, was born in this tribe in the town of Ajdir. In account of the tribe, the Spanish military army has overgone its hardest defeat during the Anoual battle, causing the death of more than thousands people. The Ait Ouriaghel/Aït Wayagher tribe was the biggest and the more powerful  one of the Rif.

In 1958, during the Rif uprising asking for better living conditions, better health care and paved roads , the Ait Ouriaghel tribe has rebelled and was severely punished by the Morocco King Hassan II who sent the army to the Rif and ordered them to massacre as much as possible riffians.

Since 1950s, the Al Hoceima province in which belongs the Ait Ouriaghel, have supplied an important continguent of emigrante worker for the Netherlands, France, Belgium and Spain as well as the town of Tanger.

Khmas system
The Ait Waryaghar are with the Ikeräiyen the only Riffian tribes that make use of the Khmas system. A khams (singular for Khmas) is a sort of independent tribe inside a tribe, with their own qaid (tribe-leader). These are the five Khmas of the Ait Waryaghar:
 Khams of the Ait Youssef Ou Ali
 Khams of the Ait Bouayach
 Khams of the Imrabten
 Khams of the Ait Abdallah
 Khams of the Ait Hadifa
After the independence of Morocco in 1956 there was a national board regime implemented, while the previously applicable khmas system became discontinued.

Geography
The tribe of the Ait Waryaghar covers a large area in the center of the Rif.
The Ait Waryaghar borders on the following tribes:
western: Targuist, Ait Mezdoui and Ait Itteft.
eastern: Temsaman and Ait Touzin.
northern: Ibaqoyen.
southern: Igzennayen and Ait Ammart.

These are the cities that belong to the tribe of the Ait Waryaghar:

 Al Hoceima (107.000 residents), southern part of this city is situated on Ait Waryagher territory. 
 Imzouren (28.000 residents)
 Ait Bouayach (17.000 residents)
 Ajdir (3500 residents)
 beni Hadifa (3000 residents)
 Tamassint (1800 residents)

Famous people from the Ait Wayagher
Abd el-Krim, military leader and president of the anti-colonial Rif Republic
Nasser Zefzafi, Political activist who was sentenced to 20 years in prison
Omar Khattabi, surgeon and political leader tortured during the 1970s.
Mohammed Ziane, Politician and lawyer
Mohamed Mrabet, storyteller
Abdelkader Ouaraghli, former international goalkeeper
Ibrahim Affelay, Dutch-born Moroccan football player
Mounir El Hamdaoui, Dutch-born Moroccan football player
Saïd Boutahar, Dutch-born Moroccan football player

External links 
 Waryaghar information bank

Bibliography
  David Montgomery Hart, The Aith Waryaghar of the Moroccan Rif (Tucson, Arizona, 1976)

Berbers in Morocco
Berber peoples and tribes
Moroccan tribes
Rif